The thick-billed vireo (Vireo crassirostris) is a small songbird. It breeds in the West Indies in the Bahamas, Turks and Caicos Islands, Cayman Islands, Tortuga Island in Haiti and on cays off the coast of Cuba. It occasionally can be found as a vagrant to south Florida in the United States. The subspecies V. c. approximans of Providencia Island is sometimes treated as a subspecies of the mangrove vireo (V. pallens) or as a separate species, the Providencia vireo.

Breeding
This vireo frequents bushes and shrubs in tropical thickets. The grass-lined nest is a neat cup shape, attached to a fork in a tree or bush branch. 2-3 dark-spotted white eggs are laid. Both the male and female incubate the eggs.

Description
The thick-billed vireo is approximately 14 cm in length. Its head and back are a greyish olive, and the underparts are buffy white. The wings and tail are dark, and there are two white wing bars on each wing. The eyes have dark irises. Sexes are similar. It shows a yellow partial spectacle just above the bill.
There are five subspeciesaccording to the University of Michigan Zoology Dept.: 
Vireo crassirostris crassirostris
Vireo crassirostris stalagmium
Vireo crassirostris crassirostris
Vireo crassirostris alleni 
Vireo crassirostris tortugae

Call
The thick-billed vireos song is a variable and rapid six to seven note phrase, starting and ending with a sharp chick, very similar to the white-eyed vireo, but slightly harsher in sound.

Diet
The diet of this species consists almost exclusively of insects.

References

thick-billed vireo
Endemic birds of the Caribbean
Birds of the Bahamas
Birds of the Cayman Islands
Birds of Haiti
Birds of the Turks and Caicos Islands
thick-billed vireo
Taxa named by Henry Bryant (naturalist)
University of MichiganMuseum of Zoology